Otto Viktor Frölicher (5 June 1840 in Solothurn – 2 November 1890 in Munich) was a Swiss landscape painter.

Life 
His father worked for the local government. In 1859, he enrolled at the Academy of Fine Arts Munich, and became a student of landscape painting under Johann Gottfried Steffan. Four years later, he moved to Düsseldorf, where he came under the influence of Oswald Achenbach. After going home to Solothurn, he found that he was unable to earn a living as a painter there and returned to Munich and discovered a new influence, Adolf Heinrich Lier. In 1876, he travelled to Paris on the recommendation of Lier, but was not able to adapt to big city life and, a year later, returned to Munich which, at that time, had barely 200,000 people.

He was a member of several major artists' associations and served as a judge for exhibitions at the Glaspalast. Also, he was chairman of an organization devoted to the interests of Swiss artists residing in Munich.

At the age of thirty-nine, he suffered a bout with diphtheria, which left him in permanent ill-health. Later, he was diagnosed with cancer. Contemporary sources, however, give his cause of death as a "groin disease" (contracted while painting in the wild?) that led to jaundice.

Selected paintings

References

Further reading 
 Roswitha Hohl-Schild: Otto Frölicher. Ein Schweizer Maler des 19. Jahrhunderts auf der Suche nach seiner Landschaft. Graduate thesis, University of Zürich, 1987.
 Hermann Uhde-Bernays: Otto Frölicher. Sein Leben und Werk. Biography. Schwabe, Basel 1922.
 Gottfried Wälchli: Otto Frölicher 1840-1890. Biography. Gassmann, Solothurn 1950.

External links 

 ArtNet: More paintings by Frölicher

19th-century Swiss painters
Swiss male painters
1840 births
1890 deaths
Landscape painters
19th-century Swiss male artists
Düsseldorf school of painting